The White House Presidential Personnel Office (PPO, sometimes written as Office of Presidential Personnel) is the White House Office tasked with vetting new appointees. Its offices are on the first floor of the Eisenhower Executive Office Building in Washington, D.C. The PPO is one of the offices most responsible for assessing candidates to work at or for the White House.

The Office is responsible for approximately 4,000 political appointment positions, of which 1,600 require Senate confirmation. The White House Presidential Office recruits candidates to serve in departments and agencies throughout the Executive Branch. It presents candidates for presidential appointments with Senate confirmation (PAS) to the Senate after they have been approved by the President of the United States. The mission of the office is to provide the president with the best applicants possible for presidency-appointed positions. Lastly, it also provides policy guidance for federal department and agency heads on conduct for political activities.

In 2018, the PPO was made up of about 30 members, about one-third of its usual staff. The professionalism of the PPO under President Trump was challenged, with The Washington Post reporting that the office was staffed with largely-inexperienced personnel. As of July 2021, the PPO under President Biden has returned to its usual staffing numbers, with about 80 people in the office.

Responsibilities 
The responsibilities of the Presidential Personnel Office include:

 handling and processing recommendations from political figures.
 keeping a talent bank of qualified, cleared candidates on hand.
 search for job candidates:
 executive search.
 screening interviews.
 candidate evaluation.
 security clearance.
 conflict of interest clearance.
 forwarding recommendations to the president.

History
The White House Personnel Office (WHPO) was created by Frederick V. Malek in 1971 to standardize the White House's hiring process. In 1974, President Gerald Ford renamed the WHPO to the Presidential Personnel Office (PPO) and restructured it to focus more on presidential appointments, relying more on department heads to secure non-presidential appointments in their departments.

On January 4, 2017, President Donald Trump named Johnny DeStefano Director of PPO in the incoming Trump administration. On January 30, 2017, DeStefano wrote a letter to Acting Attorney General Sally Yates informing her of her dismissal. DeStefano left the position on May 24, 2019.

In January 2020, Trump appointed John McEntee Director of PPO, reporting directly to Trump, who tasked him with identifying and removing political appointees and career officials deemed insufficiently loyal to the Trump administration. On October 21, 2020, two weerks before the 2020 elections, President Trump signed an executive order creating a new Schedule F category within the excepted service for employees “in confidential, policy-determining, policy-making and policy-advocating positions”. He also instructed agencies to identify and transfer competitive service employees that meet that description into the new job classification, an initiative that could strip hundreds of thousands of federal workers of their civil service protections and effectively make them at-will employees. Reviews by agencies are due at the PPO by January 19, 2021, a day before the end of the Trump presidency.

Leadership
 James F. Gammill, Jr. (???–1978)
 Arnold J. Miller (1978–???)
 E. Pendleton James (1981–1982, as Office of Presidential Personnel)
 Robert H. Tuttle (1985–1989)
 Chase Untermeyer (1989–1991)
 Constance Horner (1991–1993)
 Bruce Lindsey (1993–???)
 Clay Johnson III (2001–2003)
 Dina Powell (2003–2005)
 Liza Wright (2005–2007)
 Joie Gregor (2007–2008)
 Donald Gips (January 2009 – October 2009)
 Nancy Hogan (October 2009 – July 2013)
 Jonathan Mcbride (July 2013 – February 2015)
 Valerie E. Green (February 2015 – March 2016)
 Johnny DeStefano (2017 – February 9, 2018)
 Sean E. Doocey (February 9, 2018 – April 2020)
 John McEntee (January 8, 2020 – January 20, 2021)
 Catherine M. Russell (January 20, 2021 – January 31, 2022)
 Gautam Raghavan (January 31, 2022 – present)

References

1971 establishments in Washington, D.C.
Executive Office of the President of the United States